Rolling Prairie was a South Shore Line flag stop located at County Road 500 East which served the communities of Rolling Prairie and Birchim in LaPorte County, Indiana. The station opened prior to 1910, and closed on July 5, 1994, as part of an NICTD service revision which also saw the closure of Ambridge, Kemil Road, Willard Avenue, LaLumiere, and New Carlisle.

References

Former South Shore Line stations
Former railway stations in Indiana
Railway stations in LaPorte County, Indiana
Railway stations closed in 1994